A. Y. Jackson Secondary School can refer to two high schools in Ontario, Canada:
A. Y. Jackson Secondary School (Ottawa), in the Kanata area of Ottawa
A. Y. Jackson Secondary School (Toronto), in the North York area of Toronto